Ruby Stacey (born March 10, 2005) is a British artistic gymnast. In 2019, Stacey was selected as a travelling reserve for the 2019 Junior World Artistic Gymnastics Championships. She made her senior debut in 2021 where she represented Great Britain at the 2021 World Artistic Gymnastics Championships in Kitakyushu, Japan, placing 15th in the all-around.

Competition History

References 

2005 births
Living people
British female artistic gymnasts